Woomera, unofficially Woomera village, refers to the domestic area of RAAF Base Woomera. Woomera village has always been a Defence-owned and operated facility. The village is located on the traditional lands of the Kokatha people in the Far North region of South Australia, but is on Commonwealth-owned land and within the area designated as the 'Woomera Prohibited Area' (WPA).

Woomera 'village' is part of RAAF Base Woomera which, along with the Woomera Test Range (WTR), forms the larger entity known as the Woomera Range Complex (WRC), promulgated by Chief of Air Force (CAF) in June 2014. As at the  the Woomera Village had a population of 146, and its usual population varies between 150 and 200 people, yet the village can provide accommodation and services for up to 500 people per day. Although the complex is closed to the public, Woomera village, and its four museum elements, is open to the public all year round. The location of the Woomera Village can be described as being in the outback desert area of South Australia. There are 27 pastoral stations within the Woomera Prohibited Area, which essentially forms the ground space of the Woomera Test Range, and there are currently four major mines (2013) - Challenger, Prominent Hill, Peculiar Knob, and Cairn Hill. There is also a long-established precious gems (mainly opal) field near the Coober Pedy end of the Stuart Highway which cuts through the middle of the Range.

Etymology

The settlement draws its name, woomera, from a suggestion from RAAF Group Captain Alfred George Pither and was subsequently chosen by the Board of the Long Range Weapons Establishment in April 1947. The new Village was established on Commonwealth land procured for the purpose, and named after the Aboriginal spear throwing implement the woomera which extends the range a spear can be thrown.

History

Establishment
Construction of Woomera Village began in mid-1947 to cater for thousands of people moving there as part of the Anglo-Australian Project. The project lasted for 34 years and saw Woomera become one of the most secret allied establishments in operation during the Cold War. However, by the end of the 1960s the Anglo-Australian Joint Project was rapidly winding down following the UK Government's reduction in further experimental work.

Woomera Village initially operated as a "closed town" between 1947 and 1982, when the facility supported the operations of the Woomera Rocket Range during the Anglo-Australia Project. Since 1982, the general public has been able to visit and stay at Woomera. However, only Australian Government (mostly Department of Defence) personnel and contractors to the Commonwealth are able to live at Woomera on a permanent basis. The settlement was established in 1947 as a result of the Department of Defence establishment of the adjacent rocket testing range. The Woomera Village grew rapidly from 1950. A school opened that year with two teachers and by 1955 had grown to be a 'Higher Primary' school from Year 1 to Intermediate (Year 10) with over 300 pupils.

Following its construction over 1947–53, Woomera Village essentially operated under a specialised Commonwealth/Defence township management model rather than a local government (council) model. At the height of its operations (1947–99), over 7,000 people lived in Woomera Village. To service the needs of the town during this period, the Woomera Board, staffed by members of the Defence community at Woomera elected to the Board by town residents, essentially acted in the role normally provided by a local government council. However, the creation of a Defence Estate management organisation in the 1990s shifted the focus of the Board's activities away from estate and infrastructure management toward principally that of a base welfare organisation supporting the small permanent community and the large number of transit Defence personnel who deploy to Woomera each year. Woomera Village, when originally established, was administered by the Long Range Weapons Establishment (LRWE) under the terms of the 'Anglo-Australian Joint Project'.

When the Anglo-Australian Joint Project began to wind down in the early 1970s, the village population began to rapidly drop from its peak of about 7000 residents in the mid-1960s. In the late 1990s, as the Nurrungar program was winding down, the ADF reassessed the role of Woomera in its future force structure. What became apparent to the ADF at that time was that the Woomera Test Range was the only land-based test range left in the Western world capable of testing the next (or what is now termed '5th') generation of weapons systems within a fully instrumented, land-based, specialized [test and evaluation] range. This assessment was to result, positively, in redefining the future role and strategic importance of the Woomera Range Complex within Australia's long-term Defence requirements.

Defence facilities

Woomera Village is a Department of Defence-owned and operated facility. The aerodrome lies within the 'Red Zone' of the Woomera Prohibited Area (WPA) and public access to this part of the base is not permitted. Woomera Village, however, is within a "Green Zone" of the WPA and thus public access to the facilities and services of Woomera, including the several museums located in this historic site, is permitted year round. Visitors may also stay in the Defence operated Eldo Hotel, and there is a privately operated public caravan park at the entrance to Woomera Village.

While the WRC operates under the higher management of Woomera Range Headquarters (WRHQ), located at RAAF Base Edinburgh, the operation of the Base itself is co-managed by the RAAF's Combat Support Group (CSG) and Defence Estate & Infrastructure Group (DEIG). CSG focus on the operational aspects of the base's role, while DEIG focuses on ensuring the base's (and the Range's) facilities and general infrastructure remains fit for the purpose it is needed to support the Range's activities. Woomera Village has always been and continues to be the domestic support facility for the Woomera Range Complex.

The WPA is the world's largest land-based instrumented defence systems test and evaluation range facility.

The complex was established in support of the Anglo-Australian Joint Project. This cold-war project focussed on the development of long-range weapons systems, principally to counter the growing intercontinental ballistic missile threat from the former Soviet Union. The cold-war heyday of the Range was 1947 to about 1972. In 1980 the Anglo-Australia Project was closed and the range itself saw little use until about 1991 when the RAAF's Aircraft Research and Development Unit (ARDU) took over the old instrumented range from Defence Science and Technology Organisation (DSTO). Since that time, the RAAF has gradually assumed full control of the entire facility. The complex today is much smaller than it was in 1947, but still covers one-seventh of South Australia. Although there are now several major mines established within the WPA, the Woomera support base is the only permanently established township facility in the WPA.

Officially, the village area is referred to as 'Base Sector South' of RAAF Base Woomera, and like the RAAF Base at Point Cook in Victoria, this part of the complex is open to public access. This is principally so that tourists can access the significant historical displays and museums which cover the range's air and space activities since its establishment in 1947. At the Woomera Heritage Centre, there are also displays covering the Indigenous and Pioneer heritage of the region. In particular, there is a dedicated section on Len Beadell who became something of an outback legend as a Royal Australian Survey Corps Sergeant surveyor (1947–48) and road builder (1953–63). There is also a memorial cairn for Len Beadell and his wife Anne in the nearby Woomera Cemetery.

Public visitors (estimated at in excess of 70,000 per annum) generally find Woomera village to be a very quiet place. Principally this is due to the fact that the base is essentially the dinner, bed, and breakfast facility for Defence personnel. Today the complex embraces a much wider range of Defence systems technology and tactics testing and evaluation activities. In terms of space activities only a small number of sub-orbital sounding rocket tests are conducted. In June 2010, however, Woomera hosted the return of the Hayabusa Deep Space Probe. This was the first planned space re-entry to Australian soil and created another milestone for the Range.

Settlement history

Nurrungar project

In 1969, as the Anglo-Australia Project was winding down, the United States Air Force (USAF) began construction and installation of the Nurrungar Joint Tracking Facility. Over the next 30 years, this project ensured the maintenance of Woomera village infrastructure, with improvements and modernization of facilities. During the period of operations, around 1,100 USAF and ADF personnel and their families were accommodated at Woomera, and the population was around 4,000.

The new era of Woomera
When the Nurrungar Project came to an end in 1999, the future of the village looked bleak. However, the RAAF was set to take over the range following a long-term study of Defence needs through to 2035, which found that the Woomera Test Range was the only test and evaluation range left in the western world capable of testing the next generation of ADF defence systems within its land borders – and it could be utilized all year round given its climatic advantages. Additionally, the Federal Government decided to establish several immigration detention centres around the country to deal with a growing number of illegal immigrants and asylum seekers arriving by sea, and Woomera was chosen as a site for such a facility.

The establishment of the Woomera Immigration Detention Centre in 1999, through the refurbishment of the original Woomera Village construction camp at 'Woomera West', eventually brought in new permanent staff (as the Nurrungar people were leaving) to settle and maintain the village population at around 1,200. The immigration detention centre, however, proved to be a highly controversial facility and it closed in early 2003 after only about 36 months of operation, at which point the land and buildings were handed back to the Defence Department.

Camp Rapier
Following the closure of the Immigration Detention Centre, and the return of the site to the ADF, Woomera West was redesigned, altered, and re-established as a secure defence garrison support facility and renamed 'Camp Rapier'. It is now frequently used by the Australian Army and squadrons of the RAAF's Airfield Defence Guards as a base camp for specialized training and testing activities. It also has had a detachment of Australian Air Force Cadets from South Australia stay there.

Post-2003
Post-2003, the village population stabilized at about 400, but has subsequently dropped to around 150–200. When the RAAF assumed operational command of Woomera in 1999, there was an increase in the number of temporary residents associated with the conduct of test and evaluation activities on the range. In 2009 Woomera village was the largest ADF domestic base support facility in Australia, and the village is open to public access. There is a high visitation rate by tourists to view the National Missile Park in the centre of the village (which features aircraft, rockets, bombs and missiles covering the full period of the Range's operations), the Woomera Heritage Centre (which features an introductory audio visual presentation and an interpretive gallery that tells the story of this site), and the Community Museum that is maintained by the village's volunteer community board and which is located within the missile park precinct.

Generally, the residents of Woomera are defence workers or contractors. There are no privately owned homes in the village although some are leased to agencies such as the Bureau of Meteorology. The facilities in the village include a gym, hotel, swimming pool, hospital, cinema, school, two museums and missile park. There is also a supermarket, community radio station (107.3 Triple-R FM Woomera - 'rocket range radio'), post office, bowling alley, a football sports club ('Sporties'), Returned Services League, Thrift Shop, and Bowling Club.

The village is jointly managed by the RAAF and the Defence Estate & Infrastructure Group (E&IG). Garrison support services for the complex are provided by Defence contractors managed by E&IG. These services include care and maintenance of the base and range infrastructure, messing, accommodation, security, and limited emergency response and airfield service as well as operational support to Defence activities on the Range.

Climate
Woomera has an arid climate with hot, dry summers and cool, mostly dry winters.

Woomera village today
The population of Woomera is about 136 permanent residents. However, this number can quadruple with the passage of personnel moving in and out of the base as part of range trials activities. 40 years ago the people who conducted the trials also lived at Woomera, however, with modern communications technology only the people who provide the range support services now need to live at Woomera. Annually, a total of about 5,000 to 6,000 people deploy to Woomera to conduct tests, trials and training activities at the Range.

The management of the Range's infrastructure is the responsibility of Defence Support and Reform Group (DSRG), but the Woomera Board is a long-standing and integral part of the base's local support network. The Woomera Board is composed of five elected members from the village's permanent residents, and four members who are appointed by the current Base Support Manager. The aim of the Woomera Board is to build the sense of community, given its remote location. The Board also prints a weekly news letter - Gibber Gabber.

The base is located in the Woomera Prohibited Area (WPA) and it is an RAAF establishment. However, similar to the RAAF Base at Point Cook, Woomera is open to the visiting public. Non-Defence visitors to Woomera are able to stay at the 'Eldo Hotel' which offers 400 beds in a varying range of formats. The hotel reception, including the "Oasis" bar and restaurant, is located in the former Eldo administration facility. Rooms are generally located close to the main hotel facility and some blocks have names such as "Redstone", "Black Knight", "Blue Steel" and "Skylark" - all former rocket or missile systems once tested at Woomera. The nearby "Traveller's Village Caravan Park" is a privately operated venture centered around the old "senior ranks' mess" facility at the entrance to the base from the main road. It mostly services the motor home and backpacker travellers passing through Woomera.

Tourism

Woomera's attractions include the Woomera National Aerospace and Missile Park, located in the centre of the village. This park features missiles and rockets that were developed and tested at Woomera over the last 60 years, as well as a number of aircraft which were used in trials at Woomera. The Woomera Heritage Centre, which was the former recreation centre for USAF personnel and their families from Nurrungar, features a cafe, a tenpin bowling alley (which was installed by the US Air Force personnel in the 1990s and is still in good working order), a modern interactive display and interpretive centre covering the full life of the Range, a souvenir shop, and a significant display of regional history. This display also features the story of legendary Len Beadell, the famous surveyor who laid out the original range across vast tracts of the Australian Outback stretching from Woomera to the North-West coast of Western Australia. Next to Missile Park, there is a museum featuring range artifacts and the activities and people who lived and worked at Woomera in the early years. This museum is located in one of four former churches which existed in Woomera. Other attractions include a movie theatre (but movie screenings may be infrequent), swimming centre, a well stocked general store and bottle shop, along with two main clubs which offer counter meals on a Thursday (RSL Club) and Friday (Sports Club) nights. Woomera is a haven for observing and understanding Australia's desert flora and fauna, and there is an observatory which operates one night a week or by appointment.

The historic precinct of the town attracts a large number of visitors each year to view the many local attractions including the Missile Park, Heritage Centre, History Museum and other attractions such as Butement Square, the Eldo Hotel (formerly the headquarters for European Launch Development Organisation), and the local observatory. Approximately 65,000 tourists a year visit Woomera, with about half of that number going on to visit Roxby Downs (location of the BHP Olympic Dam Mine).

See also

 British nuclear tests at Maralinga 
 RAAF Woomera Range Complex
 RAAF Woomera Airfield

References

External links

 
 
 
 
 

Woomera
History of Australia (1945–present)
Far North (South Australia)
1947 establishments in Australia